Carey May (born 19 July 1959 in Dublin) is a former long-distance runner from Ireland, who won the Osaka Ladies Marathon in 1983 and 1985. She is married to Dave Edge, a British-Canadian Olympic long-distance runner.

Achievements

References

 BYU-profile
 

1959 births
Living people
Athletes (track and field) at the 1984 Summer Olympics
Brigham Young University alumni
Irish female long-distance runners
Olympic athletes of Ireland
World Athletics Championships athletes for Ireland
Sportspeople from Dublin (city)
Irish female marathon runners